Pippa Jody Grandison (born 12 September 1970) is an Australian actress and singer. She currently lives in Sydney, with her husband Steve Le Marquand and son.

Career
Pippa Grandison was born in Perth, Western Australia. She made her debut in the Australian television drama series A Country Practice in 1990. Notable TV and film credits include All Saints (1999–2006), Muriel's Wedding (1994) and Babe: Pig in the City (1998; voice role). Grandison then became part of a pop group called Ladykiller, and began to dedicate her singing voice to musical theatre, playing leading roles in the musicals The Witches of Eastwick, We Will Rock You, Company, and "Georgy Girl": Story Of The Seekers.

Wicked
She later received the chance to star in the role of Elphaba in the Australian production of the musical Wicked during the Sydney season of the show, when its main star, Amanda Harrison, fell ill. Grandison shared the role with Jemma Rix; each of them performing four shows a week. Her first show took place on 18 December 2009. She was initially a temporary replacement, until it was announced on 9 February 2010, that Harrison would no longer be returning to the show, and that Grandison and Rix would be alternating as the lead on a permanent basis.

She exited the company on 23 May 2010, at the end of her contract. Her replacement was Patrice Tipoki, who understudied the role in the original Australian cast.

Filmography

References

External links
 

1970 births
Living people
Actresses from Perth, Western Australia
Australian film actresses
Australian musical theatre actresses
Australian television actresses